Xylinophylla hypocausta is a moth of the family Geometridae first described by William Warren in 1897. It is found in Peninsular Malaysia, Singapore, Sumatra and Borneo.

The species has been treated as a subspecies of Xylinophylla maculata for some time.

The larvae feed on Aleurites moluccanus.

External links

Ennominae
Moths of Asia
Moths described in 1897